James Stephen Alldis, born at Paddington, London, on 27 December 1949, was an English cricketer who played two first-class matches for Middlesex in 1970.

A left-handed lower-order batsman and a left-arm orthodox spin bowler, Jim Alldis was the son of the former Middlesex scorer A. J. Alldis. His father also being known as Jim, he was referred to at Lord's as Jim Alldis Jr. In his two matches, he scored seven runs at an average of 2.33 and took one wicket for 37, the single wicket being that of Keith Wheatley of Hampshire.

He played for Middlesex's second eleven in the Second Eleven Championship between 1968 and 1976 and later represented Berkshire in the Minor Counties Championship.

He was later a schoolmaster in Devon.

References

1949 births
Living people
English cricketers
Middlesex cricketers
Berkshire cricketers